Amerila serica is a moth of the subfamily Arctiinae first described by Edward Meyrick in 1886. It is found in the Australian states of New South Wales and Queensland.

Adults have uniform translucent pale brown wings. The hindwings have a broad fringe of hairs along the inner margin. When disturbed, the moth exudes a froth from behind its head.

References

Moths described in 1886
Amerilini
Moths of Australia